Jörgen Berglund (born 1974) is a Swedish politician.  he serves as Member of the Riksdag representing the constituency of Västernorrland County. He was also elected as Member of the Riksdag in September 2022. He is affiliated with the Moderate Party.

References 

Living people
1974 births
Place of birth missing (living people)
21st-century Swedish politicians
Members of the Riksdag 2018–2022
Members of the Riksdag 2022–2026
Members of the Riksdag from the Moderate Party